FC Lausanne–Sport (also referred to as LS) is a Swiss football club based in Lausanne in the canton of Vaud. Founded in 1896, Lausanne Sport played in the Swiss Super League in their most recent 2021–22 season, the highest tier of football in the country, but will play in the second tier Swiss Challenge League in the 2022–23 after being relegated in the 2021–22 Swiss Super League Season. 

They play their home games at the 12,544-capacity Stade de la Tuilière.  Previously Lausanne Sport had played at the Stade Olympique de la Pontaise, a 15,850 all-seater stadium used for the 1954 FIFA World Cup. They played in Swiss First Division between 1906 and 1931, 1932–2002, 2011-2014, 2016-2018 and 2020-2022. The team has won seven league titles and the Swiss Cup nine times.

History

19th century

The club was founded in 1896 under the name of Montriond Lausanne. However, the Lausanne Football and Cricket Club was established in 1860, believed to be the oldest football club on the European continent by some historians.

20th century

The club took the name Lausanne-Sports FC in 1920 after the football section merged with the Club Hygiénique de Lausanne, a physical education club. The end of the 1950s and the whole of the 1960s were among the club's finest times. LS won the Swiss Cup twice (1962 and 1964), lost an additional Swiss Cup final to Basel by forfeit, won the Swiss championship (1965) and was runner-up four times (1961, 1962, 1963), as well as in 1969. The year 1965 was the year of the 7th and last Swiss championship title. It was probably the most successful, earning its protagonists the nickname of "Lords of the Night", a reference to some enchanting evenings. Since the advent of the floodlights in the new stadium, the matches have mainly taken place in the evenings which was at the time a unique feature.

21st century

After the 2001–02 season, Lausanne-Sports were relegated because the club did not obtain a first level license for the 2002–03 season.  Following the 2002–03 season in the second division, Lausanne-Sports FC were again relegated due to bankruptcy. They were reformed as FC Lausanne-Sport for the 2003–04 season and had to begin play at the fourth tier. The team was promoted in consecutive seasons from the fourth division after the 2003–04 season and the third division after the 2004–05 season. After an additional six years in the second tier of Swiss football, the club was promoted to the Super League for the 2011–12 season for a three season stay before being relegated in 2014. After two seasons in the second tier the team was promoted for a two season stay in the top division in 2016 and survived relegation in their first season before being relegated back to the second tier again in 2018. Now somewhat of a yo-yo club the team were promoted to the top tier again in 2020.

Lausanne-Sport qualified for the 2010–11 UEFA Europa League after they reached the 2010 Swiss Cup final against Champions League-qualified Basel. In the 2010–11 Europa League, while still playing in the second tier Challenge League, they performed a shock getting to the group stages beating favourites Lokomotiv Moscow on the way.

Lausanne-Sport were relegated to the Swiss Challenge League at the end of the 2013–14 Swiss Super League season. Two years later, they finished first in the 2015–16 Swiss Challenge League, which promoted them back to the top tier of Swiss football for the 2016–17 season.

On 13 November 2017, the club was acquired by Ineos, a Swiss-based British petrochemicals company owned by Jim Ratcliffe, the nation's wealthiest person. The first transfer under the new ownership was that of Enzo Fernández, son of Zinedine Zidane. However, the season ended with relegation. Ratcliffe's brother Bob became club president in March 2019. The club won promotion back to the top flight as champions of the 2019–20 Swiss Challenge League.

Honours

League
Ligue Nationale A/Super League
Winners (7): 1912–13, 1931–32, 1934–35, 1935–36, 1943–44, 1950–51, 1964–65
Runners-up (8): 1946–47, 1954–55, 1961–62, 1962–63, 1968–69, 1969–70, 1989–90, 1999–2000
Ligue Nationale B/Challenge League
Winners (4): 1931–32, 2010–11, 2015–16, 2019–20
1. Liga Promotion
Winners: 2004–05
1. Liga Classic
Winners: 2003–04

Cups
Swiss Cup
Winners (9): 1934–35, 1938–39, 1943–44, 1949–50, 1961–62, 1963–64, 1980–81, 1997–98, 1998–99
Runners-up (8): 1936–37, 1945–46, 1946–47, 1956–57, 1966–67, 1983–84, 1999–2000, 2009–10
Swiss League Cup
Runners-up: 1980–81

Players

Current squad

Other players under contact

Out on loan

Former players

Coaching staff

|}

Former coaches

 Billy Hunter (1922–23)
 Jimmy Hogan (1925)
 Fred Spiksley (1928)
 Robert Pache (1931–32)
 Jimmy Hogan (1933–34)
 Alwin Riemke (1934–35)
 Friedrich Kerr (1939)
 Frank Séchehaye (1942–43)
 Fritz Leonhardt and  Georg Baumgartner (1943–45)
 Louis Maurer (1945–50)
 Béla Volentik (1950–51)
 Jacques Spagnoli (1951–53)
 Joseph Schaefer (1953–54)
 Bram Appel (1954–55)
 Fernand Jaccard (1955–57)
 Walter Presch (1957–60)
 Albert Châtelain (1960–61)
 Charles Marmier and  Frank Séchehaye (1961–62)
 Jean Luciano (1962–64)
 Roger Reymond and  Roger Bocquet (1964)
 Roger Reymond (1964–65)
 Kurt Linder (1965–66)
 Wilhelm Hahnemann (1966–67)
 Roger Vonlanthen (1967–72)
 Louis Maurer (1972–74)
 Paul Garbani (1974–76)
 Miroslav Blažević (1976–79)
 Charly Hertig (1979–82)
 Péter Pázmándy (1982–84)
 Radu Nunweiller (1984–87)
 Umberto Barberis (1 August 1987 – 20 June 1993)
 Marc Duvillard (1993–94)
 Martin Trümpler (1 July 1994 – 30 June 1995)
 Georges Bregy (1 July 1995 – 30 September 1997)
 Radu Nunweiller and  Pierre-André Schürmann (1998)
 Pierre-André Schürmann (24 October 1998 – 11 December 2000)
 Victor Zvunka (1 July 2000 – 30 June 2001)
 Radu Nunweiller (1 July 2001 – 5 December 2001)
 Umberto Barberis (20 February 2002 – 8 May 2002)
 Pablo Iglesias (2002–03)
 Gabriel Calderón (1 January 2003 – 30 June 2003)
 Jochen Dries (2003–04)
 Gérard Castella (1 July 2005 – 24 May 2006)
 Alain Geiger (1 June 2006 – 21 November 2006)
 Paul Garbani and  P. Isabella (interim) (24 November 2006 – 11 December 2006)
 Stéphane Hunziker and  Patrick Isabella (17 February 2007 – 30 May 2007)
 Umberto Barberis (1 July 2007 – 17 December 2007)
 Thierry Cotting (15 December 2007 – 30 June 2009)
 John Dragani (1 July 2008 – 30 June 2010)
 Árpád Soós (19 March 2010 – 30 June 2010)
 Martin Rueda (1 July 2010 – 30 June 2012)
 Laurent Roussey (1 July 2012 – 21 October 2013)
 Alexandre Comisetti (22 October 2013 – 7 November 2013)
 Henri Atamaniuk (8 November 2013 – 20 June 2014)
 Francesco Gabriele (1 July 2014 – 9 October 2014)
 Marco Simone (13 October 2014 – 24 March 2015)
 Fabio Celestini (24 March 2015 – 2018)
 Giorgio Contini (2018 - 9 June 2021)
 Ilija Borenović (10 June 2021 - 4 February 2022)

Recent seasons
Recent season-by-season performance of the club:

Key

Lausanne-Sports Rowing

Lausanne-Sports Aviron is the rowing club of Lausanne-Sport.

References

External links

 Football department
 Athletics department
 Roller hockey department (archived 2 April 2002)
 Rowing department

 
Sport in Lausanne
Multi-sport clubs in Switzerland
Football clubs in Switzerland
Association football clubs established in 1896
1896 establishments in Switzerland